The Samen or Ghadr-101 missile is a road-mobile solid propelled MRBM that was revealed during a military parade on 21 September 2008 and then tested on 10 November 2008 as a response to a US missile-shield test that took place on 3 November 2008, details of the missile after that were kept classified. The missile is believed to be derived from the DF-15 rocket and have received help  with its Ashoura (missile)/Ghadr-110 MRBM replacement for the Shahab-3 ballistic missile. Iran is believed to have obtained the technology from A.Q Khan's proliferation network, the Ghadr 101 motor rocket was believed to have been completed in 2005. It is suggested that the Ghadr-101 along with Ghadr-110 will provide Iran with ASAT and IRBM capability.

Characteristics
It has a triconic warhead. Whether it is single-stage or 2-stage is still unknown. It has a payload capacity of 650–1158 kg High-explosive, a diameter of 1.0-1.25 m and a length of 9 m and a range of 750–800 km.

References 

Weapons and ammunition introduced in 2008
Short-range ballistic missiles of Iran
Surface-to-surface missiles of Iran
Theatre ballistic missiles